Dendrobium taurinum, the bull orchid, is a species of flowering plant in the family Orchidaceae. It is found in the Philippines and in the Indonesian Province of Maluku. The size of the flower ranges from 5 to 6.5 cm.

References

taurinum
Orchids of Asia
Orchids of Indonesia
Orchids of the Philippines
Flora of the Maluku Islands
Plants described in 1838